The Europe Sails Special Dimensione is an Austrian high-wing, single-place, hang glider that was designed and produced by Europe Sails.

Design and development

The aircraft is made from aluminum tubing, with the wing covered in Dacron sailcloth. The design was certified as DHV class 2-3 and sold for €2778 in 2003.

Specifications (Special Dimensione)

References

Hang gliders